"Your Eyes" is a song recorded by South Korean boy band Stray Kids. It appears as the sixth and final track on their second Japanese-language extended play (EP), Circus. The song was released on June 1, 2022, through Epic Records Japan, as the second single of the EP after the Japanese version of "Maniac".

Release and composition

Stray Kids' second Japanese-language extended play (EP), was announced on April 4, 2022. Later the title Circus and track listing were revealed on May 16, including the sixth and final track "Your Eyes". The song was released to digital music and streaming platforms on June 1, in conjunction with its accompanying music video.

"Your Eyes" is described as a love ballad song driven by piano, written by Bang Chan and Changbin from 3Racha, an in-house production team of Stray Kids, and KM-Markit, and co-composed with Jun2. The song expresses the lover's gaze with the feeling of anxiousness sometimes but still wishing to be happy in the relationship. It was composed in the key of D major, 130 beats per minute with a running time of three minutes and seventeen seconds.

Commercial performance

"Your Eyes" entered the Billboard Japan Hot 100 in the chart issue dated June 8, 2022, at number 68; on its component charts, the song debuted at number 60 on the Streaming Songs.

Music video

An accompanying music video for "Your Eyes" was premiered on June 1, 2022, alongside the single release. It was preceded by eight member-individual teasers. Directed by Novvkim, the music video is described as a "virtual date", drawing the lover's perspective spend time doing several things with each member all day long, from the morning to the night.

Credits and personnel

Personnel
 Stray Kids – vocals, background vocals
 Bang Chan (3Racha) – lyrics, composition, all instruments, computer programming, vocal directing, digital editing
 Changbin (3Racha) – lyrics, composition, vocal directing
 Han (3Racha) – lyrics, composition, vocal directing
 KM-Markit – Japanese lyrics
 Jun2 – composition, arrangement, all instruments, vocal directing
 Lee Sang-yeop – recording
 Lim Hong-jin – mixing
 Kwon Nam-woo – mastering

Locations
 Sony Music Publishing (Japan) Inc. – publishing
 JYP Publishing (KOMCA) – publishing
 JYPE Studios – recording, mixing
 821 Sound Mastering – mastering

Charts

Release history

References

2022 singles
2022 songs
Japanese-language songs
Sony Music Entertainment Japan singles
Stray Kids songs